Luis Lisandro Roux Cabral (17 November 1913, in Montevideo – 1973?) was an Uruguayan chess master.

Chess career

He won the Uruguayan Chess Championship twice,  in 1948 and 1971, and played for Uruguay in the Chess Olympiads of 1939, 1964 and 1966.

"The Uruguayan Immortal"

In the Uruguay Championship of 1943, Roux Cabral defeated Molinari with a brilliant sacrificial attack; the combination is known as "The Uruguayan Immortal". Fred Reinfeld annotated the game on pages 11–12 of the Chess Correspondent, May–June 1944. His final remark was: "A game destined for immortality."

References

External links

Uruguayan people of French descent
Uruguayan chess players
Chess Olympiad competitors
Possibly living people